The Willys Jeep Truck is a truck made by Willys-Overland Motors from 1947 to 1965.  The styling and engineering of the Jeep Truck was based on Willys' existing vehicles, the Willys Jeep Station Wagon and the Jeep CJ-2A.

Production
It was available as a pickup truck, a platform stake truck, a chassis cab, or a bare chassis. A ¾-ton two-wheel drive version became available by 1949.

The truck was restyled in 1950 with the addition of a V-shaped grille with five horizontal bars.

Optional accessories included an engine governor, a power takeoff, and a pulley drive. A "Dump-O-Matic" hydraulic hoist became available for 1957.

Over 200,000 of these trucks were manufactured.

Models

Drivetrain

The Jeep Truck was available with only one transmission, the Borg-Warner T-90 three-speed manual, with synchromeshed second and third gears. A Spicer/Dana 18 transfer case was used on four-wheel drive models. The heavy duty Timken 51540 was used in the early years of production, later being replaced by the Dana 53. The front axle was a Dana 25

Notes

References

External links

 International Full Size Jeep Association
 Vintage Jeeps

Jeep Truck
Jeep Truck
Pickup trucks
Vehicles introduced in 1947
1940s cars
1950s cars
1960s cars
Motor vehicles manufactured in the United States